Irving Amen (1918–2011) was an American painter, printmaker and sculptor.

Life
Born in New York City in 1918, Amen began drawing at the age of four. A scholarship to the Pratt Institute was awarded to him when he was fourteen years old.

From 1942 to 1945 he served with the Armed Forces. He headed a mural project and executed murals in the United States and Belgium.

His first exhibition of woodcuts was held at the New School for Social Research and his second at the Smithsonian Institution in 1949. He also exhibited at the Artists House in Jerusalem, the Library of Congress, and the National Academy of Design.

Amen studied in Paris in 1950. Upon his return to the United States, he had one man shows in New York and Washington DC.

In 1953, Amen traveled throughout Italy. This resulted in a series of eleven woodcuts, eight etchings and a number of oil paintings. One of these woodcuts, "Piazza San Marco #4" and its four woodblocks constitute a permanent exhibit of block printing in color at the Smithsonian Institution.

Travel in Israel, Greece and Turkey in 1960 led to a retrospective show at the Artist's House in Jerusalem. His art is widely owned and loved. Irving Amen has taught at Pratt Institute and at the University of Notre Dame.  He had a show of woodcuts at the Artists Studio in NYC.

In 1974 he illustrated The Epic of Gilgamesh in linocuts and woodcuts for the Limited Editions Club. He designed a set of stained glass windows depicting the Twelve Tribes of Israel for Agudas Achim Synagogue in Bexley, Ohio. His work often depicts themes of Judaism, chess, people, music, Italy and Don Quixote. In his later years he lived and worked in Boca Raton, Florida.

Commissions include a Peace Medal in honor of the Vietnam War. He created designs for 12 stained glass windows 16 feet high depicting the Twelve Tribes of Israel, commissioned by Agudas Achim Synagogue in Columbus, Ohio.

He is listed in Mantle Fielding's Dictionary of American Painters, Sculptors and Engravers and the Dictionary of Contemporary American Artists by Paul Cummings.  Amen was also a member of the Society of American Graphic Artists.  He was elected member of Accademia Fiorentina Delle Arti Del Disegno, an organization to which Michelangelo, his idol, belonged.

Born in New York City, he taught at the Pratt Institute and at the University of Notre Dame in the early 1960s.

Notable collections – U.S. 
Museum of Modern Art, New York
National Museum of American History, Washington, D.C.
 The Metropolitan Museum of Art, New York
The National Gallery of Art Washington
University of South Alabama – Mobile, Alabama
Arizona State University – Tempe, Arizona
Tucson Museum of Art – Tucson, Arizona
Arkansas Art Center Foundation – Little Rock, Arkansas
Arkansas State University – State University, Arkansas
Judah L. Magnes Memorial Museum – Berkeley, California
Skirball Museum Hebrew Union College – Los Angeles, California'
Mills College – Oakland, California
Stanford University Museum of Art – Stanford, California
Hausatonic Museum – Bridgeport, Connecticut
Yale University – New Haven, Connecticut
University of Georgia – Athens, Georgia
Honolulu Academy of Arts – Honolulu, Hawaii
Art Institute of Chicago – Chicago, Illinois
Quincy College Art Gallery – Quincy, Illinois
Rosary College – River Forest, Illinois
Illinois State Museum – Springfield, Illinois
Lafayette Art Center – Lafayette, Indiana
Art Gallery, University of Notre Dame – Notre Dame, Indiana
Davenport Municipal Art Gallery – Davenport, Iowa
Des Moines Art Center – Des Moines, Iowa
University of Maine Art Gallery – Orono, Maine
Baltimore Museum of Art – Baltimore, Maryland
Boston Museum of Fine Arts – Boston, Massachusetts
Harvard Art Museum – Boston, Massachusetts
Town of Brookline Public Library – Brookline, Massachusetts
Fogg Art Museum – Cambridge, Massachusetts
De Cordova and Dana Museum – Lincoln, Massachusetts
Art Museum Mount Holyoke College – South Hadley, Massachusetts
Museum of Fine Arts – Springfield, Massachusetts
Albion College – Albion, Michigan
University of Minnesota – Minneapolis, Minnesota
Central Missouri State University – Warrensburg, Missouri
Art Gallery University of Nebraska – Lincoln, Nebraska
The Art Museum Princeton University – Princeton, N.J.
Dartmouth College – Hanover, New Hampshire
Rutgers University – New Brunswick, New Jersey
Museum of New Mexico – Santa Fe, New Mexico
Jewish Museum – New York City, N.Y.
New York Public Library – New York City, N.Y.
State University of New York – New Paltz, N.Y.
University of Rochester Memorial Art Gallery – Rochester, N.Y.
Syracuse University Art Collection – Syracuse, N.Y.
Asheville Art Museum, Asheville, North Carolina
Salem College – Winston-Salem, North Carolina
Cincinnati Art Museum – Cincinnati, Ohio
Dayton Art Institute – Dayton, Ohio
Butler Institute of American Art – Youngstown, Ohio
Oklahoma Museum of Art – Oklahoma City, Oklahoma
Coos Art Museum – Coos Bay, Oregon
Oregon State University – Corvallis, Oregon
Lehigh University – Bethlehem, Pennsylvania
City of Philadelphia Public Library – Philadelphia, Pennsylvania
Philadelphia Museum of Art – Philadelphia, Pennsylvania
Museum of Art – Carnegie Institute – Pittsburgh, Pennsylvania
The Charleston Museum – Charleston, South Carolina
Colombia Museum of Art – Columbia, South Carolina
Brooks Memorial Art Gallery – Memphis, Tennessee
Virginia Museum of Fine Arts – Richmond, Virginia
Corcoran Gallery of Art – Washington, D.C.
Library of Congress – Washington, D.C.
Smithsonian American Art Museum – Washington, D.C.
Huntington Galleries – Huntington, West Virginia
Madison Art Center – Madison, Wisconsin
Neville Public Museum – Green Bay, Wisconsin
Milwaukee Public Library – Milwaukee, Wisconsin

Notable collections – international 

Albertina Museum – Vienna, Austria
Bibliothèque Royal – Brussels, Belgium
University Art Museum – Edmonton, Canada
Fitzwilliam Museum – Cambridge, England
Usher Gallery – Lincolnshire, England
Victoria and Albert Museum – London, England
Biblioteheque Nationale – Paris, France
Bezalel National Museum – Jerusalem, Israel
Auckland City Art Gallery – Auckland, New Zealand
Statische Museum – Elberfeld, Germany

Commissions
Designed a Peace Medal to commemorate the end of the Vietnam War.
Illustrated the classic, GILGAMESH, for the Limited Editions Club.
Created Designs for twelve stained glass windows sixteen feet high depicting the twelve tribes of Israel, commissioned by Agudas Achim Synagogue at Columbus, Ohio.

References

External links
 Official website

1918 births
2011 deaths
Jewish American artists
American printmakers
Modern printmakers
University of Notre Dame faculty
Painters from New York City
21st-century American Jews